Villa Lucre is a Panama Metro station on Line 2. It was opened on 25 April 2019 as part of the inaugural section of Line 2 between San Miguelito and Nuevo Tocumen. This is an elevated station built above Avenida Domingo Díaz next to Boulevard Villa Lucre. The station is located between Cincuentenario and El Crisol.

References

Panama Metro stations
2019 establishments in Panama
Railway stations opened in 2019